Island of Bryan is an HGTV Canada reality television series of renovation, home life, and business activities, premiering in Spring 2019. The show is similar to House of Bryan and Bryan Inc., two previous shows starring builder Bryan Baeumler, his wife Sarah, and their children; along with Bryan's apprentice Adam. The Baeumler family is renovating and restoring a tropical island beachfront resort, to operate as their own, that the Baeumler couple has bought by leveraging everything they have, and their financial  safety net.

In its first season the series ranked third of all specialty television programs in Canada and became the highest rated show on HGTV Canada in over a decade. The series was renewed for a second season, to continue the renovations and bring the resort to its opening. The series was renewed for a 13 episode third season which was filmed during the COVID-19 pandemic. A fourth season aired during the spring of 2022, and the fifth season aired during the fall of 2022.

Premise
The Baeumlers have bought an abandoned beachfront resort on South Andros island, the largest and least developed of the Bahamas islands, renaming it the Caerula Mar Club. They have moved their entire family to the resort to live while they rebuild it, and hope to open within six months or lose it, without its cashflow.

Production
In 2017, the Baeumlers vacationed on South Andros in the Bahamas. They found the abandoned resort Emerald Palms, the original half-century old 18-room hotel and clubhouse; plus 22 villas, spa and beach bar added later, on a  property; that had been renovated a few times since. The resort had closed down in 2011. When weather socked them in, they found the resort for sale on the internet. The resort is located 20 minutes from Nassau and an hour from Fort Lauderdale. They bought the resort, and starting living on a boat initially, and then moved into one of the 500-sqft. villas while renovating it. The couple left a management team back home to manage their businesses, while they work on the resort project. They originally planned to open the resort in May 2019. They started renovation work on the resort in March 2018.

HGTV greenlit the TV series in 2017, succeeding the second season of Bryan Inc., with the same production company, Si Entertainment. Filming started in 2018 for the 2019 premiere. Island of Bryan premiered on 7 April 2019, in a 60-minute timeslot on HGTV Canada, to start a season of 13 episodes. The TV show marks the first time a HGTV Canada show renovated a site that was open for the public to visit. The Royal Bank of Canada has integrated into the series, with custom commercials advertising its products with the series stars in the commercial breaks.

In May 2019, it was announced that the series would return for a second season in the Winter, and cover the six months needed to complete renovations to the remaining portion of the resort, ending the series. Season two would be eight episodes filling a 60-minute timeslot starting Winter 2020. The second season premiered on 23 February 2020 and ended on 12 April 2020.

The show was renewed for a third season by distributor Corus. The third season, consisting of ten hour-long episodes, aired from 18 April 2021 to 25 July 2021. It began amidst the COVID-19 pandemic, and continued renovations to the resort that were not part of Phase I or were not completed in time for the grand opening; it also covered the operations of the resort. The season consisted of an initial five episodes, airing from 18 April 2021 to 16 May 2021, followed by the remaining five episodes, airing from 27 June 2021 to 25 July 2021.

On 26 July 2021, Bryan Baeumler confirmed, on social media, that a fourth season was in the process of being filmed. Season 4 and season 5 were greenlit for fall 2022 and fall 2023, with eight-hour-long episodes each. The seasons will cover further Bahamas resort stuff, and renovations to their Florida taxiway house.

Cast
The shows two main cast are Bryan Baeumler and Sarah Baeumler along with their family. The show also has other cast such as contractors and hotel staff.

Main cast
Bryan Baeumler – builder, Canadian owner
Sarah Baeumler – designer, Canadian owner
Quentyn "Q" Baeumler – elder son
Charlotte "Shar" Baeumler – elder daughter
Lincoln "Link" Baeumler – younger son
Josephine "JoJo" Baeumler – younger daughter
Adam Weir – construction supervisor, Canadian apprentice builder to Bryan; legacy Canadian from House of Bryan, Bryan Inc.

Additional cast
Trish – interior designer; legacy Canadian from House of Bryan
Nyguen – construction foreman; Bahamian local
Hatchie – plumber; Bahamian local
Poitier – electrician; Bahamian local
Derek – electrician; Bahamian local
Quincy – contractor; Bahamian local
Jimbo – construction worker; Bahamian local
Antonio – tiling; Bahamian local
Wendell – HVAC technician; Bahamian local
Wellington – wallpapering; from Nassau
Lawrence – painter; Bahamian local
Yellow – CM staff; Bahamian local
Simon – mason; Bahamian local
Mark – resort general manager
Cate – resort general manager
Sebastian – resort's executive chef

Guest cast
Archie – groundskeeper; Bahamian local working on site for over a decade
Marco – landskeeper; Bahamian local working on site for over a decade
Ellen – operations manager, Canadian protege to Sarah
Erica – administrative assistant
Lea – administrative assistant
Daniel – food service assistant manager
Todd – facilities manager and Canadian construction crew from Bryan's company
Kevin – only licensed exterminator on South Andros
Scott – Canadian construction crew from Bryan's company
Dave – Canadian construction crew from Bryan's company
Josh – Canadian construction crew from Bryan's company
Dean – Canadian construction
Dave – Canadian TV decking personality
Kate Campbell – Canadian TV decking personality
Rob – plumber shipped in from Canada
Paul Reinhold – Canadian electrician, regular on Bryan's other TV shows.
Werner Baeumler – Bryan's father
Colleen Baeumler – Bryan's mother
Jessica – Sarah's Canadian assistant, hotel staff
Shayla – Sarah's Canadian assistant, hotel staff

Episodes

Series overview

Season overviews

Season 1 (2019)

Season 2 (2020)

Season 3 (2021)

Season 4 (Spring 2022)

This season functions as House of Bryan: Florida Vacation Home; a season 5 for that older show.

Renovation Island season 4 aired in the Summer 2022 U.S. TV season on HGTV USA, later than the Spring 2022 Canadian TV season for Island of Bryan season 4 on HGTV Canada.

Season 5 (fall 2022)

This season functions as House of Bryan: Florida House; a season 6 for that older show.

Broadcast
Following its success in Canada, the series was picked up by HGTV U.S. and premiered on 7 June 2020, under the title Renovation Island. The U.S. series Renovation Island is an edited version of the Canadian series Island of Bryan. Following the success of Renovation Island on HGTV U.S., this led to the licensing of the preceding Canadian series Bryan, Inc. as Renovation, Inc., for the U.S. channel. A spin-off of Renovation Island/Island of Bryan is set to air in 2023, called Renovation Resort, will set up a lakefront resort bought by Scott McGillivray, where Bryan Baeumler will come in and help renovate and set up the resort.

Reception
The first season ranked third in Canada for specialty television programming, and was the highest rated show on HGTV Canada in over a decade.

Follow-up
With the conclusion of season 5 in fall 2022 TV season, a new follow-up hour-long TV series is to air in 2023 with 10 episodes.

Caerula Mar Club

Caerula Mar Club is an island resort located in the South Andros part of Andros, Bahamas. The resort was named "Caerula Mar" (Latin for 'deep blue sea') in reference to the cerulean-coloured sea. Its stated philosophy is to have barefoot luxury for guests. As a luxury resort, initial pricing was between US$350 and US$1100 per night. This is with the saga of seeing, acquiring, Phase 1 renovations, and Phase 1 grand opening occurring over a two-year period. The resort has been designed around eco-friendliness, fair trade, and sourcing from sustainable farms and producers.

The resort is located near Drigg's Hill, where the Drigg's Hill Dock (the local harbour) is located. The local airport is Congo Town International Airport.

Resort history
The resort was originally built in the 1960s and operated under various names up until eight years before production on the show began. It contained a central hotel of 18 rooms, plus 22 villas. The oldest building, the hotel block, was completed in 1969 for the resort's original opening. At the time the resort last operated, it had room intercoms (but no outside phone lines for rooms), marble floors, and private decks with palm-lined individual gardens.

During the show Island of Bryan, the Baeumlers turn the abandoned resort into Caerula Mar Club, which was initially planned to be completed in mid-May 2019, and opened in June 2019.

The business established by the Baeumlers by the end of the first season of Island of Bryan is Caerula Mar Club resort. Its first season of business was to start in mid-May 2019, but this was delayed until June 2019. With the unanticipated delays and travails, opening was pushed back for a summer soft opening and a Phase I grand opening in fall 2019. The planned grand opening was 1 November 2019. It opened with a snackbar, bar, and restaurant, along with a spa offering massage services.

At the time of the December 2019 Phase I grand opening, there were 18 hotel suites and six villas in operation on the property, with four dining areas, both fine and casual. The opening represented the first new resort on the island in two decades. The Robb Report named it one of the 12 best hotels in the Caribbean. It was later named on the 2020 Hot List of new hotels for Condé Nast Traveler.

In March 2020, because of the COVID-19 pandemic, the resort had to close down. The resort reopened for business in October 2020. As a COVID mitigation measure, Caerula Mar started to offer a full resort reservation, to buy out the entire resort, when it reopened. Caerula Mar, along with other Bahamian resorts, started to offer on-site COVID-19 SARS-CoV-2 testing to guests in 2021.

Notes

References

Further reading

External links

Island of Bryan on HGTV Canada
Renovation Island on HGTV USA
Caerula Mar Club

2010s Canadian reality television series
2019 Canadian television series debuts
Andros, Bahamas
Bahamian television shows
Bryan Baeumler television franchise
English-language television shows
HGTV (Canada) original programming